"I Can't Get Over You" is a song written by Ronnie Dunn and Terry McBride, and recorded by American country music duo Brooks & Dunn. It was released in January 1999 as the fourth single from their album If You See Her, and it reached a peak of number 5 on the Hot Country Singles & Tracks chart, and number 51 on the Billboard Hot 100.

Chart positions
"I Can't Get Over You" debuted at number 49 on the U.S. Billboard Hot Country Singles & Tracks chart for the week of January 16, 1999.

Year-end charts

References

1999 singles
1998 songs
Brooks & Dunn songs
Songs written by Ronnie Dunn
Songs written by Terry McBride (musician)
Song recordings produced by Don Cook
Arista Nashville singles